Shrimad Bhagwat Mahapuran is an Indian mythological television series produced by Nikhil Dwivedi.

Plot
Krishna answers Radha's questions  and tells tales from Srimad Bhagavatam in no particular order.

Cast
Shiny Doshi as Radha
Rajneesh Duggal as Krishna 
 Shalini Vishnudev as Yashoda 
Ishita Ganguly as Parvati
Indraneil Sengupta as Shiva
 Vidisha as Sita
Wasim Mushtaq as Rama
Ali Hassan as Ravana
Aashish Kaul as Prahlada
Hrishikesh Pandey as Daksha
Rahul Ranaa as Ahiravan 
Harsh Vashisht as Parikshit
Riyanka Chanda as Uttarāa
Kajal Jain as Shurpanakha
Kunal Bakshi as Ravana
Ketaki Kadam as Gayatri
Ketan Karande as Vali/Sugriva
Ayaan Zubair Rahamani as Child Krishna
Dinesh Mehta as Shantanu
Monica Sharma as Devi Ganga
Meet Mukhi as Young Prahlada
 Vandana Lalwani as Gandhari
 Ayaz Khan as Devraj Indra
Amit Varma as Viprachitti
 Vijay Badlani as Devrishi Narada
 Amit Pachori as Bhagwan Vishnu
 Smriti Khanna as Iravati
Garima Jain as Shachi
Nazea Hasan Sayed as Tulsi
 Iti Kaurav as Maya
Sailesh Gulabani as Satyavrata
Nidhi Seth as Vedavati
Danish Akhtar Saifi as Hanuman
Priyom Gujjar as Lakshman
Meer Ali as Young Bhishma
Viraj Kapoor as Young Krishna
Aryavart Mishra as Young Ganesh
Sushant Marya as Balram

Episodes

References

External links
 Official website on Voot
 

Indian television series about Hindu deities
2019 Indian television series debuts
Hindi-language television shows
Indian television series
Colors TV original programming